Al-Hadar (Arabic: الحضر) is a village and the center of Al-Hadar District (Hatra District) in Nineveh Governorate in Iraq.

The ancient ruins of Hatra lie 2 km northwest of the modern settlement. The population of the settlement and nearby villages greatly shrank by 2012 due to deforestation.

On April 26th 2017, the ruins were reclaimed by Iraqi soldiers from Islamic State terrorists who had previously captured the area encompassing the ancient city along the course of their illegal occupation of Iraqi territories.

See also
 Hatra

References

Populated places in Nineveh Governorate